Lumut can refer to: 

 Lumut, Perak, a coastal town in Malaysia
 Lumut (federal constituency), Perak
 Lumut, Brunei, a populated place in Belait District, Brunei